Henryville Jr/Sr High School is located in Henryville, Indiana. It is part of Borden/Henryville School Corporation District.

History

On March 2, 2012, the school was severely damaged by a tornado, but there were no reports of major injuries.

Demographics
The demographic breakdown of the 525 students enrolled in 2016-17 was:
Male - 51.0%
Female - 49.0%
Asian - 0.3%
Black - 0.5%
Hispanic - 2.7%
White - 93.6%
Multiracial - 2.9%

32.2% of the students were eligible for free or reduced-cost lunch. In 2016–17, Henryville was a Title I school.

Athletics
The Henryville Hornets compete in the Southern Athletic Conference. The school colors are black and gold. The following Indiana High School Athletic Association (IHSAA) sanctioned sports are offered:

Baseball (boys)
Basketball (girls and boys) 
Cross country (girls and boys) 
Golf (girls and boys) 
Soccer (boys)
Softball (girls) 
Swimming (girls and boys) 
Tennis (girls and boys) 
Track and field (girls and boys) 
Volleyball (girls)

See also

 List of high schools in Indiana

References

External links
Henryville Jr/Sr High School website 
 https://www.whas11.com/article/news/local/indiana/indiana-new-borden-henryville-school-district-school-start-date-july/417-b57d7b1b-dc23-45ad-98a3-f1cefc503f8b

Educational institutions in the United States with year of establishment missing
Public high schools in Indiana
Schools in Clark County, Indiana
Public middle schools in Indiana